The Revenue Act 1766 (6 Geo. III ch. 52) was an Act passed by the Parliament of Great Britain in response to objections raised to the Sugar Act 1764. The Revenue Act was passed in conjunction with the Free Port Act 1767.

The Act was repealed by the Statute Law Revision Act 1867.

References
Tyler, John W. Smugglers & Patriots: Boston Merchants and the Advent of the American Revolution. Boston: Northeastern University Press, 1986. .

External links
 Text of the Act, from HathiTrust

Great Britain Acts of Parliament 1766
1766 in the Thirteen Colonies
18th-century economic history
Laws leading to the American Revolution
Repealed Great Britain Acts of Parliament